Lithuania men's national goalball team is the men's national team of Lithuania.  Goalball is a team sport designed specifically for athletes with a vision impairment.  It takes part in international competitions.

Members of the team participate in the several international tournaments each year within the country at the capital Vilnius and the Paralympic training centre nearby at historic Trakai.

Paralympic Games

2000 Sydney 

The team competed in the 2000 Summer Paralympics, between 18 and 29 October 2000, at an Olympic Park indoor hall,  Sydney, New South Wales, Australia.  They came second.

2004 Athens 

The team competed in 2004 Summer Paralympics, between 17 and 28 September 2004, in the Faliro Sports Pavilion Arena, Athens, Greece.  They came ninth.

2008 Beijing 

The team competed in 2008 Summer Paralympics, from 6 to 17 September 2008, in the Beijing Institute of Technology Gymnasium 'bat wing' arena, Beijing, China.  There were 12 men's teams and 8 women's teams taking part in this event.  They came second.

2012 London 

The team competed in the 2012 Summer Paralympics from 30 August to 7 September 2012, in the Copper Box Arena, London, England.  They came fourth.

Quarter-finals

Semi-finals

Finals

2016 Rio de Janeiro 

The team competed in the 2016 Summer Paralympics, with competition from Thursday 8 September to finals on Friday 16 September 2016, in the temporary Future Arena, Rio de Janeiro, Brazil.  They won the gold medal.

Quarter-finals

Semi-finals

Finals

2020 Tokyo 

The team competed in the 2020 Summer Paralympics, with competition from Wednesday 25 August to finals on Friday 3 September 2021, in the Makuhari Messe arena, Chiba, Tokyo, Japan.  They qualified at the 2019 IBSA Goalball Paralympic Ranking Tournament at Fort Wayne, Indiana, United States of America.

The team finished as bronze medalists, behind China, and Brazil.

Coach was Valdas Gecevicius, and staff member Ugnius Savickas.  Jerseys were predominantly green or white.

Round-robin

Quarter-finals

Semi-finals

Finals

World Championships

1998 Madrid 

The team competed in the 1998 World Championships, in Madrid, Spain.

2002 Rio de Janeiro  

The team competed in the 2002 World Championships, in Rio de Janeiro, Brazil, from 30 August 2002 to 8 September 2002.

2006 Spartanburg  

The team competed in the 2006 World Championships, in July 2006, in Spartanburg, South Carolina, United States of America.

2010 Sheffield 

The team competed in the 2010 World Championships, from 20 to 25 June 2010, in Sheffield, England.  They were in Pool B.

2014 Espoo  

The team competed in the 2014 World Championships from 30 June to 5 July 2014, in Espoo, Finland.  They were in Pool B, won their quarter-finals defeating the Czech Republic 11:6, but were mercied by Brazil 14:0 in the semi-finals.  In the bronze medal match, they were defeated by the United States, 2:4.

Athletes: Mantas Brazauskis (#4), Saulius Leonavicius (#5), Montvydas Nerijus (#1), Mantas Panovas (#6), Genrik Pavliukianec (#7), and Marius Zibolis (#8).

2018 Malmö 

The team competed in the 2018 World Championships from 3 to 8 June 2018, at the Baltiska Hallen, Malmö, Sweden.  They placed second in Pool A winning six of their seven games, beating the United States 7:4 in the quarter-finals, before being beaten by Brazil in the semi-finals 6:7.  For the third place playoffs, they were beaten by Belgium 2:9.  The team was fourth in final standings.

Athletes included: Arturas Jonikaitis (centre).

2022 Matosinhos 

The team competed in the 2022 World Championships from 7 to 16 December 2022, at the Centro de Desportos e Congressos de Matosinhos, Portugal.  There were sixteen men's and sixteen women's teams.  They placed second in Pool D, and fourth in final standings.

IBSA World Games

2015 Seoul  

The team competed in the 2015 IBSA World Games from 10 to 17 May 2015, in Seoul, South Korea.  Beating China 10:3, the team took the gold medal.

Regional championships 

The team competes in the IBSA Europe goalball region.  Groups A and C are held one year, and Group B the following year.  Strong teams move towards Group A.

2013 Konya (Group A)  

The team competed in the 2013 IBSA Goalball European Championships, Group A, from 1 to 11 November 2013, at Konya, Turkey.  They beat Finland in the quarter-finals, 9:5, mercied Germany in the semi-finals 13:3, going onto beat Spain in the finals, 4:2.

2015 Kaunas (Group A) 

The team competed in the 2015 IBSA Goalball European A Championships, from 5 to 12 July 2015, in Kaunas, Lithuania.  The tournament was organised by the Lithuanian Blind Sports Federation.  Beating Ukraine 13:8 in the quarter-finals, they went on to lose to Finland 5:13.  They mercied Czech Republic 15:5, to take third place.

2017 Pajulahti (Group A) 

The team competed in the 2017 IBSA Goalball European A Championships from 15 to 23 September 2017, at Pajulahti, Nastola, Finland.  They placed first, beating Germany  6:3.

Athletes included: Nerijus Montvydas, Justas Pazarauskas (highest goalscorer of the tournament), Mindaugas Suchojevus, and Marius Zibolis.

2019 Rostock (Group A) 

The team competed in the 2019 IBSA Goalball European A Championships from 5 to 14 October 2019, in Rostock, Germany.  They placed third in the final standings.

Athletes included: Arturas Jonikaitis (centre), Nerijus Montvydas, Mantas Panovas, Justas Pazarauskas, and Marius Zibolis.

See also 

 Disabled sports
 Lithuania at the Paralympics

References 

National men's goalball teams
Lithuania at the Paralympics
European national goalball teams